This page lists albums, singles, and compilations by the musician Elvis Costello, distinguishing between United States and United Kingdom release dates and record labels. Of note are the reissue series, Costello's back catalogue having undergone reissue three times by three different companies.

Albums

Studio albums

Notes
A ^ Some reissues of This Year's Model are credited to 'Elvis Costello and The Attractions'.
B ^ Elvis Costello is the composer of this orchestral score for ballet. The work is performed by the London Symphony Orchestra conducted by Michael Tilson Thomas.

Live albums

Compilation albums

Box sets

EPs

Singles
The following is a list of all Costello's commercially available singles. The key for the Artist Credit below is as follows:

Notes
E ^ "Watching the Detectives" was a stand-alone single in the UK but was subsequently included on US versions of My Aim Is True.
F ^ "(I Don't Want to Go To) Chelsea" was not included on US versions of This Year's Model. "Radio Radio" was a stand-alone single in the UK but was subsequently included on US versions of This Year's Model.
G ^ The Attractions played on almost all of Costello's singles from 1978 to 1984 (and sporadically thereafter), but note that 1980's "New Amsterdam" was a solo single on which Elvis Costello played all instruments. Accordingly, The Attractions were not credited.
H ^ "I Wanna Be Loved" / "Turning the Town Red" was tracked as a double A-side in the UK, with both sides charting.  "Turning The Town Red" did not initially appear on Goodbye Cruel World, although it has been added as a bonus track to some CD reissues of this album.
I ^ Although the Attractions played on "Sulky Girl" and "13 Steps Lead Down", these tracks were credited simply to Elvis Costello.
J ^ The backing musicians on "Tear Off Your Own Head" and "45" were Steve Nieve, Davey Faragher, and Pete Thomas, later to be collectively billed as "The Imposters". However, these releases are credited solely to Costello.
K ^ "Brilliant Mistake" was released as a UK single in 2005, 19 years after the track first appeared on the album King of America. Though the album was credited to The Costello Show, the single release was credited to Elvis Costello.
L ^ Both "A Slow Drag With Josephine" and "Jimmie Standing In The Rain" were issued as limited edition 78 rpm 10" singles.  For these single releases, the design conceit was to emulate the look of a real 1930s 78 rpm single, and accordingly the artist credit on the label was given as "The Lupotones (Vocal refrain by Elvis Costello)"

Limited edition singles

Contributions

Studio

Live/alternate takes

Other work

Albums which credit Costello as a featured artist

Guest appearances

Remixes

Albums

EPs

with the New Basement Tapes

References

Discography
Rock music discographies
New wave discographies
Discographies of British artists